Gunter is a city in the southwestern corner of Grayson County, Texas, United States. The population was 2,060 at the 2020 census, up from 1,498 at the 2010 census. It is part of the Sherman–Denison metropolitan area.

History

Gunter was founded in 1902 (other sources report 1901, with a post office as early as 1898) when the family of John (a/k/a Jot) Gunter deeded  for the original townsite, near the intersection of current State Highway 289 and Farm to Market Road 121. The first residence was established in 1903 by Albert Earthman, who would later charter the First National Bank in Gunter. A second bank, the First State Bank, would later open.

Gunter steadily grew until 1924, when the First State Bank (having outlasted the First National Bank) closed its doors, leaving many businessmen and farmers in financial ruin. The Great Depression and two devastating fires in 1930 and 1948 further damaged the local economy.

However, Gunter began to grow again in the 1950s, and experienced its greatest growth in the last two decades, growing 37% in population during the 1990s. Recent developments include the opening of a Sonic Drive-In and a Dollar General. In May 2002, a branch of Ada, Oklahoma-based Landmark Bank opened in Gunter, providing the town its first financial institution in nearly 90 years.

Geography

Gunter is located in southwestern Grayson County at  (33.451331, –96.744479). State Highway 289 leads north  to Sherman, the county seat, and south  to Celina.

The city's boundaries expanded dramatically during the decade between 2000 and 2010.

Demographics

2020 census

As of the 2020 United States census, there were 2,060 people, 495 households, and 413 families residing in the city.

2010 census
As of the census of 2010, there were 1,498 people, 324 households, and 243 families residing in the city. The population density was 818.7 people per square mile (316.6/km2). There were 345 housing units at an average density of 229.6/sq mi (88.8/km2). The racial makeup of the city was 82.36% White, 0.73% African American, 1.22% Native American, 0.49% Asian, 13.41% from other races, and 1.79% from two or more races. Hispanic or Latino of any race were 24.88% of the population.

There were 324 households, out of which 43.5% had children under the age of 18 living with them, 56.8% were married couples living together, 13.9% had a female householder with no husband present, and 24.7% were non-families. 23.5% of all households were made up of individuals, and 14.8% had someone living alone who was 65 years of age or older. The average household size was 3.02 and the average family size was 3.60.

In the city, the population was spread out, with 28.0% under the age of 18, 9.8% from 18 to 24, 24.6% from 25 to 44, 16.9% from 45 to 64, and 20.7% who were 65 years of age or older. The median age was 35 years. For every 100 females, there were 84.4 males. For every 100 females age 18 and over, there were 80.2 males.

The median income for a household in the city was $40,000, and the median income for a family was $41,957. Males had a median income of $30,625 versus $25,938 for females. The per capita income for the city was $13,535. About 6.2% of families and 7.7% of the population were below the poverty line, including 7.7% of those under age 18 and 7.2% of those age 65 or over.

Education
Students are served by the Gunter Independent School District.

Climate
The climate in this area is characterized by hot, humid summers and generally mild to cool winters.  According to the Köppen Climate Classification system, Gunter has a humid subtropical climate, abbreviated "Cfa" on climate maps.

References

External links
 City of Gunter official website
 Handbook of Texas Online article
 Gunter Area Chamber of Commerce 
 City-Data.com

Cities in Grayson County, Texas
Cities in Texas